Julia Peng (born 20 April 1972) is a Taiwanese singer.  She won the Best Mandarin Female Singer award at the 27th Golden Melody Awards in 2016.

She is a famous singer since the 90s.

I Am a Singer
Julia Peng participated in Hunan Television's singing competition I Am a Singer, where she entered the competition as a replacement contestant on season one. She later returned on season two as a guest singer on the Biennial Concert episode, and later on season five as one of four returning singers of the season; this time however, she failed to qualify for the finals, and she was not selected in that season's Biennial concert.

.

References

1972 births
Living people
Taiwanese pop singers
Taiwanese people of Hakka descent
21st-century Taiwanese singers
21st-century Taiwanese women singers